John McIntyre (1 January 1855 – 21 November 1934) was an English prelate who served as the Roman Catholic Archbishop of Birmingham from 1921 to 1928.

Early life and ministry
Born in Birmingham, he was educated at Sedgley Park School, Wolverhampton, the English College, Douai, St Bernard's Seminary, Olton and the English College, Rome. After his ordination to the priesthood on 22 May 1880, he served at Colwich, Staffordshire, and then alternatively at Oscott and Olton until 1912. Between 1898 and 1912, he was the Vice-Rector at St Mary's College, Oscott.

Episcopal career
He was appointed an auxiliary Bishop of Birmingham and Titular Bishop of Lamus on 24 June 1912. His consecration to the Episcopate took place on 30 July 1912, the principal consecrator was Edward Ilsley, Archbishop of Birmingham, with Francis Mostyn and George Burton as co-consecrators. The next year, he was appointed Rector of the English College, Rome, despite the protests of Edward Ilsley. After five years, he was appointed an official of the Roman Curia and Titular Archbishop of Oxyrynchus on 24 August 1917.

Following Edward Ilsley's retirement, McIntyre was appointed Archbishop of Birmingham on 16 June 1921 and installed at St Chad's Cathedral, Birmingham on 5 July 1921. After seven years as archbishop of the Archdiocese of Birmingham, he was forced to resign due to ill-health on 17 November 1928 and appointed Titular Archbishop of Odessus.

He died on 21 November 1935, aged 79.

References

1855 births
1935 deaths
20th-century Roman Catholic archbishops in the United Kingdom
English College, Douai alumni
English College, Rome alumni
People from Birmingham, West Midlands
Rectors of the English College, Rome